Qiao's Grand Courtyard may refer to:

Qiao's Grand Courtyard (novel) (乔家大院), 2005 novel by Zhu Xiuhan (朱秀海)
Qiao's Grand Courtyard (TV series)
Qiao's Compound, museum in Shanxi, China